The 2021–22 California Baptist Lancers women's basketball team represents California Baptist University during the 2021–22 NCAA Division I women's basketball season. They are led by head coach Jarrod Olson who is in his ninth season at California Baptist. The Lancers play their home games at the CBU Events Center in Riverside, California as members of the Western Athletic Conference.

This season will be CBU's fourth of a four-year transition period from Division II to Division I. As a result, the Lancers are not eligible for NCAA postseason play.

Roster

Schedule

|-
!colspan=9 style=}| Non-conference season

|-
!colspan=9 style=}| WAC conference season

|-
!colspan=9 style=|WAC Tournament

|-
!colspan=9 style=|WNIT

See also
 2021–22 California Baptist Lancers men's basketball team

References

California Baptist Lancers women's basketball seasons
California Baptist
California Baptist Lancers women's basketball
California Baptist Lancers women's basketball
California Baptist